Seo Deok-Kyu (Hangul: 서덕규, October 22, 1978) is a South Korean football player.

Seo was a part of South Korea who of the 2001 Confederations Cup.

Club career statistics

External links 
 
 

1978 births
Living people
Association football defenders
South Korean footballers
South Korea international footballers
Ulsan Hyundai FC players
Gimcheon Sangmu FC players
K League 1 players
2001 FIFA Confederations Cup players
Footballers from Seoul